Chester is an unincorporated community in Marion Township, Olmsted County, Minnesota, United States.  It is located immediately east of Rochester along U.S. Highway 14 near Olmsted County Roads 19 and 119.  Chester Woods Park is nearby.

Chester was an early station outside Rochester, Minnesota, from which it took its name. At some point in the late 1800s or early 1900s, this station was renamed to Haverhill, the township just to the north of Marion Township, perhaps to avoid confusion with Rochester.

References

Unincorporated communities in Olmsted County, Minnesota
Unincorporated communities in Minnesota